Diporiphora paraconvergens, the grey-striped western desert dragon, is a species of agama found in Australia.

References

Diporiphora
Agamid lizards of Australia
Taxa named by Paul Doughty
Taxa named by Luke Kealley
Taxa named by Jane Melville
Reptiles described in 2012